Lise Delamare (born Jolyse Effrey Jeanne Delamare; 9 April 1913 – 25 July 2006) was a French stage and film actress.

Partial filmography

 George and Georgette (1934)
 Les précieuses ridicules (1934)
 Pension Mimosas (1935) - Nelly
 Notre-Dame d'amour (1936) - Roseline
 The Cheat (1937) - Denise Moret
 La Marseillaise (1938) - La Reine Marie-Antoinette
 Péchés de jeunesse (1941) - Madeleine
 The Duchess of Langeais (1942) - Madame de Serizy
 La Symphonie fantastique (1942) - Harriet Smithson
 La fausse maîtresse (1942) - Hélène
 Le Destin fabuleux de Désirée Clary (1942) - Joséphine de Beauharnais
 The Count of Monte Cristo (1943) - Haydée (French version only)
 The White Waltz (1943) - Hélène Madelin
 Sowing the Wind (1944) - Fernande
Farandole (1945) - Blanche
 Father Goriot (1945) - Madame de Beauséant
 Lunegarde (1946) - Madame de Vertumne
 Raboliot (1946) - Flora
 The Captain (1946) - Léonora Galigai
 Monsieur Vincent (1947) - Françoise Marguerite de Silly, comtesse de Joigny
 A Certain Mister (1950) - Madame Lecorduvent
 The King of the Bla Bla Bla (1950) - Lucienne Lafare
 The Grand Maneuver (1955) - Juliette Duverger
 Lola Montès (1955) - Mrs. Craigie, Lola's mother
 Escapade (1957) - Mme. Mercenay
 Nathalie (1957) - La comtesse de Lancy
 L'ennemi dans l'ombre (1960) - La marquise
 Captain Blood (1960) - Marie de Médicis
 Bernadette of Lourdes (1961) - La mère générale
 Vive Henri IV... vive l'amour! (1961) - Mme de Montglat
 Les démons de minuit (1961)
 Clérambard (1969) - Madame de Lere
 Hail the Artist (1973) - Lucienne - l'actrice qui joue Lady Rosemond
 Baxter (1998) - Madame Deville

References

External links
 

1913 births
2006 deaths
People from Colombes
French film actresses
French television actresses
French stage actresses
20th-century French actresses
Sociétaires of the Comédie-Française
French National Academy of Dramatic Arts alumni